Egypt is a former settlement in Summers County, West Virginia, United States. Egypt was located to the east of Lowell.

References

Geography of Summers County, West Virginia
Ghost towns in West Virginia